Ramilisonina is an archaeologist from Madagascar.

His work has focused on the prehistory of Madagascar, especially the period between the fifteenth and nineteenth centuries. His work with Mike Parker Pearson of the University of Sheffield has also contributed to the study of megalithic monuments in Europe.

External links
Picture
Fieldwork at Stonehenge featured in PBS/Nova's "Secrets of Stonehenge" (2010) He had died in 2008 Nov. 29

References
Chippendale, C "Stonehenge Complete" (Thames and Hudson, London, 2004)
Pitts, M, Hengeworld (London, Arrow 2001)

Malagasy archaeologists
Living people
Year of birth missing (living people)